China is a hard rock band from Winterthur, Switzerland, founded in 1985. In 1988 they got a contract with Phonogram, releasing their debut album the same year. Their most successful song is "In the Middle of the Night", which peaked at No. 11 in Switzerland. All of the band's studio albums between 1988 and 2013 have entered the Top 40 album charts in Switzerland.

Biography
Formed in 1985, the original line-up consisted of vocalist Math Shiverow, guitarists Claudio Matteo (ex-Bloody Six, Danger) and Freddy Laurence, bassist Marc Lynn (ex-Stormbringer), and drummer John Dommen. By 1988, China had signed a record contract with the German branch of Phonogram Records, resulting in the band's eponymous debut album which made No. 6 on the Swiss albums chart.

Their 1989 sophomore effort, Sign In The Sky, saw  a couple of line-up changes as former Crown vocalist/guitarist Patrick Mason, also briefly with Krokus and Fast Forward, was brought in as the new lead vocalist and Brian Kofmehl (ex-Killer) took over bass duties for Lynn, who re-surfaced with Gotthard a couple of years later.  The Stephan Galfas produced Sign In The Sky, recorded in New York, would become China's most successful album. It reached No. 2 on the Swiss albums chart, eventually achieving gold status, and cracked the Top 50 in Germany. The band supported the album with an extensive European tour as opening act for Yngwie Malmsteen.

However, Mason's tenure would be short lived due to health problems and the band's 1991 Live album, recorded at the Marlboro Music Rock on September 29, 1990 in Locarno, Switzerland, featured yet another vocalist, American Eric St. Michaels, formerly with New Yorkers Big Trouble.  St. Michaels would make his studio debut on Go All The Way, released in 1991.  It would mark China's swan song for the Vertigo label.  Upon St. Michaels' exit and return to the U.S. in 1992, China teamed with vocalist Marc Storace of Krokus fame for several shows in 1993, including a concert broadcast live on Swiss national radio DRS3, issued in 2000 as the Alive album.

Newly signed to the EMI label and featuring yet another new vocalist, Douglas McCowan, as well as Johnny Giorgi taking over on drums for John Dommen, 1995's Natural Groove saw the band explore markedly different musical territory. Seeing their fortunes wane in a changing musical climate and saddled with financial difficulties, China called it a day shortly thereafter.  Matteo and Kofmehl would re-team with Storace for the Acoustical Mountain unplugged project doing cover songs and various China and Krokus cuts. The trio played all over Switzerland for several years.

Millennium fever brought about the 'China Revisited' tour in 2000 which saw a line-up of Claudio Matteo, Freddy Laurence, aka Freddy Scherer, Brian 'Beat' Kofmehl and Johnny 'Giovanni' Giorgi hit the road with three of their old singers, Math 'Struebi' Shiverow, Eric St. Michaels, and Marc Storace.  Scherer would join former China bandmate Marc Lynn in Gotthard in May 2004 replacing the departing Mandy Meyer.

In the spring of 2007, mainman Claudio Matteo received a call from Swiss concert promoters Free & Virgin asking if China would be interested in reuniting for an appearance at the Spirit of Rock festival to play alongside Heaven & Hell, Mötley Crüe, Motörhead, U.D.O. and Saxon.  It was the show that sparked a full-fledged reunion and the subsequent 'Rock Never Dies' tour in support of The Very Best of China album, which lasted through November 2009. China also made an appearance at Z Rock 07 in Wigan, Greater Manchester, England.

On 25 March 2010, the band release Light Up The Dark, their first new studio album in some 15 years, through Universal Music Switzerland and Germany's Metal Heaven label in the rest of Europe.  The line-up featured long-time members Matteo, St. Michaels and Kofmehl alongside newcomers Billy La Pietra (drums) and Mack Schildknecht (guitar) who had been brought into the fold in 2008 and 2009, respectively.  They would support Krokus on a number of dates on their 2010 Hoodoo tour.

In 2013, China entered the studio with producer Tommy Henriksen, guitarist for Alice Cooper and a friend of Eric St. Michaels from their New York days, to record their latest album, We Are The Stars'', with Dan Grossenbacher taking over for Kofmehl on bass.  Released via K-tel subsidiary Blue Martin in November 2013, it was accompanied by a video for the single "Everywhere You Are".

Discography

Studio albums

References

External links
China official website

1985 establishments in Switzerland
Musical groups established in 1985
Swiss glam metal musical groups
Swiss hard rock musical groups
Vertigo Records artists